Jüri Sillart (29 May 1943 Tallinn – 10 September 2011) was an Estonian film operator, director, producer and pedagogue.

In 1970 he graduated from Gerasimov Institute of Cinematography. From 1971 to 1994 he worked as an operator-director in Tallinnfilm. Since 1993 he is a producer and director in studio OÜ Kairiin (which he established itself).

Awards:
 2001: Order of the White Star, V class.

Filmography

 1980: Metskannikesed (cinematographer)
 1989: Äratus (director)
 2002: Leida lugu (documental film; producer, director, scenarist)
 2006: Kuldrannake (feature film; director)	
 2011: Monumentum kikilipsuga (documentary film; director, scenarist)

References

1943 births
2011 deaths
Estonian cinematographers
Estonian film directors
Estonian film producers
Recipients of the Order of the White Star, 5th Class
People from Tallinn
Burials at Metsakalmistu